Transalpina Square (meaning "Square of the Transalpina [Railway Line])"; , meaning "Europe Square"), is a square divided between the towns of Gorizia, northeastern Italy, and Nova Gorica, southwestern Slovenia. The railway station of Nova Gorica is located at the eastern end of the square, on the Slovenian side.

History

Overview
From 1947 (Treaty of Paris) an international border between Italy and Yugoslavia (Slovenia since 1991) crosses the square. Until 2004 the square was divided by a border wall; movement on the square is now free because both Italy and Slovenia are EU members and part of the Schengen Area. Before 21 December 2007, free movement was only allowed within the square provided that a person that entered the square from one country returned to that country. It is now no longer needed and has not been in use since 2007.

Naming
The square, in which is located Nova Gorica station, until 1947 Gorizia Montesanto, was named after the Transalpine Railway, Jesenice-Trieste. The naming of the square is somewhat controversial because Slovenia suggested "Europe Square", but Italy has preferred to use the old historical name Piazza della Transalpina.

Location

In the Slovenian side the square is crossed, parallelly to the station building, by a road named "Kolodvorska pot". The partly parallel Italian road is "Via Ugo Foscolo", that continues as "Via Caterina Percoto". Always on the Italian side, "Via Giuseppe Caprin", that starts in "Via Montesanto" ends in front of the station.

Events
In summers, the square is regularly used for concerts, public meetings, and public demonstrations or protests against local politics or current events.

Gallery

References

External links

Buildings and structures in Gorizia
Nova Gorica
Piazzas in Friuli-Venezia Giulia
Squares in Slovenia
Border crossings of divided cities
Italy–Slovenia border crossings